Nahir is a given name. It may refer to:

Nahir Besara (born 1991), Swedish footballer of Assyrian descent
Nahir Oyal (born 1990), Swedish footballer of Assyrian-Syriac descent
Goldi Nahir, a character in Degrassi: Next Class

See also
 
 Nadir (disambiguation)